John Garrison may refer to:

John Garrison (author), American author and scholar
John Garrison (ice hockey) (1909–1988), American ice hockey player
John Garrison (musician) (1973), English musician
John Garrison, known as Liver-Eating Johnson, mountain man of the American West
John Garrison (assemblyman), member of the 56th New York State Legislature in 1833

See also
Jon Garrison, tenor